The 1988–89 Honduran Liga Nacional season was the 23rd edition of the Honduran Liga Nacional.  The format of the tournament remained the same as the previous season.  Real C.D. España won the title after defeating Club Deportivo Olimpia in the finals.  Both teams qualified to the 1989 CONCACAF Champions' Cup.

1988–89 teams

 Curacao (Tegucigalpa, promoted)
 Marathón (San Pedro Sula)
 Motagua (Tegucigalpa)
 Olimpia (Tegucigalpa)
 Platense (Puerto Cortés)
 Real España (San Pedro Sula)
 Sula (La Lima)
 Universidad (Tegucigalpa)
 Victoria (La Ceiba)
 Vida (La Ceiba)

 Platense played their home games at Estadio Francisco Morazán due to renovations at Estadio Excélsior.

Regular season

Standings Group A

Standings Group B

Reply for 2nd place

Final round

Pentagonal standings

Final

 Real España 2–2 Olimpia on aggregate. Real España champions on better regular season record.

Top scorers
  Miguel Mathews (Motagua) with 8 goals
  Rubén Alonso (Real España) with 8 goals
  Carlos H. Lobo (Curacao) with 8 goals
  Raúl Centeno Gamboa (Platense) with 8 goals

Squads

Known results

Round 1

Relegation playoffs

Pentagonal

Unknown rounds

References

Liga Nacional de Fútbol Profesional de Honduras seasons
1988–89 in Honduran football
Honduras